Hong Kong singer Kelly Chen has released four Hong Kong Cantonese and five Taiwanese Mandarin video albums and three Taiwanese Mandarin video singles and been featured in over 100 music videos, 26 films, 6 TV series, 3 musical special features, and over 200 commercials. Kelly achieved early fame in  1994 when she appeared in the Shanghai Beer and HSBC commercials.

Video albums

Hong Kong Cantonese

Who Wants To Let Go 17 Greatest Hits 誰願放手精選十七首 (Dec. 1996)  (VCD/LD)
Faye and Kelly Party 菲琳派對 (Feb. 1997) (VCD/LD/DVD)
I Care About You So MuchMusic Videos Karaoke 對你太在乎卡拉OK (May.1999)(VCD)
UnprecedentednessMusic Videos Karaoke  前所未見精選卡拉OK (Dec. 2004)(VCD/DVD)

Taiwanese Mandarin

 Defenseless Heart 心不設防 (1998) (VCD)
 The Best Of Kelly Chen Music Video Vol.1  慧聲慧影精選集1(1999) (DVD)
Love You So Much 愛你愛的 (Mar. 2000) (VCD)
Flying 飛吧 (Jan. 2002) (VCD)
Love Appeared 愛情來了 (Mar. 2003)(VCD)

Video singles

Taiwanese Mandarin
 Insight 體會 (Aug. 1997) (VHS)
 Unbelievable(不得了)(Jan. 2001) (Business Card VCD)
 I stop crying on the count of three (數到三就不哭)(Sept. 2001) (VCD)

Music videos
Kelly has been featured in over One Hundred music videos, Her Single Three Seconds （三秒鐘）Which won 1998/1999 TVB8 Mandarin Music On Demand Awards Presentation: the Best Music Video Award.

List of videos

Filmography

Her film debut was in 1995, in Whatever Will Be, Will Be (仙樂飄飄, Xian Yue Piao Piao, literally Heavenly Music Floating in the Air). Chen has since starred and made cameos in quite a number of films. Her filmography includes:

List of films

Television

TV series

Musical Special Features

Television Host

Commercials

Chen has been involved in many commercials since she started her career. She has been spokesman of many top well-known brands. The following list shows the commercials she involved.

List of commercials

References

External links
Kelly Chen's official Vevo channel on YouTube

Actress filmographies
Videography
Videographies
Hong Kong filmographies